Hoorn is a city and municipality in the northwest of the Netherlands, in the province of North Holland. It is the largest town and the traditional capital of the region of West Friesland. Hoorn is located on the Markermeer, 20 kilometers (12 mi) east of Alkmaar and 35 kilometers (22 mi) north of Amsterdam.

Hoorn is well known in the Netherlands for its rich history. The town acquired city rights in 1357 and flourished during the Dutch Golden Age. In this period, Hoorn developed into a prosperous port city, being home to one of the six chambers of the Dutch East India Company (VOC). Towards the end of the eighteenth century, however, it started to become increasingly more difficult for Hoorn to keep competing with nearby Amsterdam. Ultimately, it lost its function as port city and became a regional center of trade, mainly serving the smaller villages of West Friesland. Nowadays, Hoorn is a city with modern residential areas and a historic city center that, due to its proximity to Amsterdam, is sometimes considered to be part of the Randstad metropolitan area. Cape Horn and the Hoorn Islands were both named after this city.

Etymology

The origin of the name Hoorn – in archaic spelling Hoern, Horne or Hoirn(e) – is surrounded in myths. According to old Frisian legends, the name comes from Hornus, a bastard son of King Redbad and brother of Aldgillis II, who presumably founded the city in 719 and named it after himself. A different theory claims that the name was derived from a sign depicting a post horn, which hung from one of the taverns established by brewers from Hamburg in the early fourteenth century.

According to Hadrianus Junius, the name could also be a reference to the city's horn-shaped port.

One of the earliest mentions of Hoorn is found in a letter which states that in 1303, a merchant from Bruges was imprisoned in West Friesland near a place called "Hornicwed". It is likely that the name Hoorn was indeed derived from Middle Dutch , or simply , and that the city was named for its location in a sharp bight of (the former) Lake Flevo.

As a descendant of the reconstructed Proto-Germanic *hurnijǭ, the name Hoorn is a cognate with Danish and Norwegian , Icelandic , Swedish , and West Frisian , which have all preserved the meaning of "corner". In Modern Dutch, however, the word  translates to "horn", both in an acoustic and anatomical sense.

History

Early history 
In the beginning of the eighth century, the threat of Viking raids led to unrest in the Frisian Kingdom, causing many people to leave their hometowns and settle elsewhere. Following this example, Hornus – a bastard son of Redbad – allegedly moved westward along with his companions and, in 719, built a settlement west of the river Vlie, which he named after himself. This legendary settlement did not exist for long, as it burnt down only a few years later.

In the Late Middle Ages, the site of present-day Hoorn was a swampy area that was not at all suitable for agriculture, as opposed to the more fertile inland. Here, overproduction of dairy products led to the establishment of a marketplace within the domain of Zwaag, where excesses could be traded for other goods. This marketplace was located near a sluice in the river Gouw, which was the most convenient passage into the Zuiderzee for the surrounding villages.

The marketplace attracted many foreign traders, most notably from Hamburg and Bremen, who came to sell their goods (mostly beer) to the local population in return for butter and cheese. This also brought three brothers from Hamburg to the area, who recognized its convenient location and decided to each build an inn near the marketplace to increase the sale of their beers. The construction of these buildings was completed in 1316 and led to the expansion of the settlement, as more merchants from Northern Germany and Denmark now visited the place to trade. As a result, the settlement quickly developed into a village, which was then given the name of Hoorn. The town officially became a city in 1357, when Hoorn was awarded city rights by William V, Count of Holland, after a lump sum payment of 1,550 schilden.

Dutch Golden Age 
Hoorn rapidly grew to become a major port city and a prosperous center of trade, which flourished during the sixteenth and seventeenth centuries, also known as the Dutch Golden Age. It was the seat of the Committed Councils of West Friesland and the Noorderkwartier from 1573 to 1795, and the seat of the Admiralty of the Noorderkwartier from 1589 to 1795, together with Enkhuizen. Furthermore, the city was an important home base for the Dutch East India Company (VOC), the Dutch West India Company (WIC) and the Noordsche Compagnie.

The city's fleet plied the seven seas and returned laden with precious commodities from the East Indies. Exotic spices such as pepper, nutmeg, cloves and mace were sold at vast profits. With their skill in trade and seafaring, sons of Hoorn established the city's name far and wide. In 1619, Jan Pieterszoon Coen (1587–1629), controversial for his violent raids in Southeast Asia, "founded" the capital of the Dutch East Indies, which he intended to name New Hoorn at first, though it was later decided that its name would be Batavia (present-day Jakarta). A statue of Coen was placed on the city's central square Roode Steen in 1893. In 1616, the explorer Willem Schouten, together with Jacob Le Maire, braved furious storms as he rounded the southernmost tip of South America. He named it  (Cape Horn) in honor of his home town.

Eighteenth century to present 

Hoorn's fortunes declined somewhat in the eighteenth century. The prosperous trading port became little more than a sleepy fishing village on the Zuiderzee. Following Napoleonic occupation, there was a period during which the town gradually turned its back on the sea. It developed to become a regional center of trade, mainly serving the smaller villages of West Friesland. Stallholders and shopkeepers devoted themselves to the sale of dairy products and seeds. After the introduction of railways and metalled roads in the late nineteenth century, Hoorn rapidly took its place as a conveniently located and easily accessible hub in the network of towns and villages of North Holland. In 1932, the Afsluitdijk was completed, and Hoorn was no longer a seaport.

The years after World War II saw a period of renewed growth. At the center of a flourishing horticultural region, the city developed a highly varied and dynamic economy. In the 1970s, Hoorn was designated as an "overflow" city by the Dutch government to relieve pressure on the overcrowded Randstad region. As a consequence, thousands of people swapped their cramped little apartments in Amsterdam for a family house with a garden in one of Hoorn's newly developed residential areas.

Geography 

Hoorn is located in the east of the North Holland peninsula, on the northwestern shore of the Markermeer – the second largest freshwater lake of the Netherlands. The city occupies an arc of land in the south of West Friesland at the northernmost end of a small bay named Hoornse Hop. The landscape of Hoorn is mostly flat and the only elevated areas are the dikes on the southern outskirts of the city. The municipality is part of the safety region  and the water board .

Climate 

Hoorn has an oceanic climate (Köppen: Cfb) strongly influenced by its proximity to the North Sea to the west, with prevailing westerly winds. Both winters and summers are considered mild, although winters can get quite cold, while summers are quite warm occasionally.

Hoorn, as well as most of the North Holland province, lies in USDA hardiness zone 8b. Frosts mainly occur during spells of easterly or northeasterly winds from the inner European continent. Even then, because Hoorn is surrounded on three sides by large bodies of water, nights rarely fall far below .

Summers are moderately warm with a number of hot days every month. It is also common to have at least a couple of snowy days each year.

The Royal Netherlands Meteorological Institute has one of its weather stations located in Berkhout, a village situated west of Hoorn. Climatological data from this station can be found in the table below.

Districts 
The municipality of Hoorn consists of the city of Hoorn (postal codes 1620–1628) and the villages of Zwaag (postal code 1689) and Blokker (postal code 1695), which are further divided into the following districts:

Culture

Architecture 
Many of the houses in the historical city center date back to the seventeenth and eighteenth centuries, especially in the area north of the harbor. Other notable buildings include:

 Hoofdtoren (1464), the former harbor control tower
 Maria-/Kruittoren (1508), a tower built in late gothic style as part of the city wall
 Oosterpoort (1578), the only remaining city gate
Waag (1609), weigh house at the junction of Grote Oost and Roode Steen
 Statenlogement (1613), former city hall
 Burgerweeshuis (1620), the former orphanage in the Korte Achterstraat
 Statencollege (1632), which houses the Westfries Museum
 Koepelkerk (1882), a Roman Catholic basilica
 Claes Stapelhof (1682), a hofje

Hoorn has notable modern buildings as well, such as:
 Schouwburg Het Park, a theater and congress center that was opened on 25 June 2004 by Queen Beatrix. The opening was delayed, as the fly tower collapsed in the night of 20 April 2001 due to faulty construction work.

Museums 
Notable museums in Hoorn include:
 Westfries Museum
 Museum of the 20th Century

Local government

Municipal council

Municipal executive 
As of 16 June 2022, the municipal executive of Hoorn consists of:

Transport

Railways 
Hoorn is connected to the Dutch railway network and has two train stations: Hoorn and Hoorn Kersenboogerd. From these stations, it is possible to travel in the directions of Enkhuizen, Alkmaar and Amsterdam. It is also the starting point of the Hoorn–Medemblik heritage railway.

Roads 
The A7 motorway, which runs from Zaandam to the German border via the Afsluitdijk, passes along Hoorn. The exit Hoorn North connects to the provincial road N302, also called , which runs from Hoorn to Lelystad via the Houtribdijk.

Notable people

Born 
The following is a list of notable people who were born in Hoorn:

Public figures 

 Hadrianus Junius (1511–1575), humanist
 Cornelis Cort (ca. 1533 – ca. 1578), engraver
 Rombout Hogerbeets (1561–1625), jurist
 Willem Schouten (ca. 1567–1625), explorer
 Jonas Michaelius (1577 – after 1638), clergyman
 Cornelius Jacobsen May (ca. 1580 – after 1624), explorer
 Willem Bontekoe (1587–1657), explorer
 Jan Pieterszoon Coen (1587–1629), colonial administrator
 Jacques Waben (ca. 1590 – ca. 1634), painter
 Pieter Anthoniszoon Overtwater (ca. 1610–1682), merchant
 Birgitta Durell (1619–1683), Swedish industrialist
 Pieter Coopse (ca. 1640–1673), painter and draughtsman
 Jacob Rotius (1644–1681), painter
 Martinus Houttuyn (1720–1798), botanist
 Adrianus Bleijs (1842–1912), architect
 Johan Messchaert (1857–1922), singer
 Aaf Bouber (1885–1974), actress
 Maria Elizabeth van Ebbenhorst Tengbergen (1885–1980), composer
 Bart Bok (1906–1983), American astronomer
 Anton Quintana (1937–2017), writer
 Corine Rottschäfer (1938–2020), model
 Martin Brozius (1941–2009), actor
 George Baker (born 1944), singer
 Cees Renckens (born 1946), physician
 Joop van Wijk (born 1950), director
 Simone van der Vlugt (born 1966), writer
 Ron Blaauw (1967), chef
 Richard Tol (born 1969), economist
 Jan van Steenbergen (born 1970), linguist
 Maria Barnas (born 1973), writer and poet
 Tim Knol (born 1989), singer-songwriter
 Stien den Hollander (born 2000), singer and rapper

Sportspeople 

 Johannes van Hoolwerff (1878–1962), Olympic sailor
 Frans Hoek (born 1956), football player
 Ruud Heus (born 1961), football player
 Stephan van den Berg (born 1962), Olympic windsurfer
 Silvan Inia (born 1969), football player
 Frank de Boer (born 1970), football player
 Ronald de Boer (born 1970), football player
 Minouche Smit (born 1975), swimmer
 Marja Vis (born 1977), speed skater
 Marcelien de Koning (born 1978), Olympic sailor
 Vera Koedooder (born 1983), racing cyclist
 Coen de Koning (born 1983), Olympic sailor
 Tine Veenstra (born 1983), bobsledder
 Adrie Visser (born 1983), track cyclist
 Wil Besseling (born 1985), golfer
 Willemijn Karsten (born 1986), handball player
 Robert Krabbendam (born 1986), basketball player
 Pim Ligthart (born 1988), road cyclist
 Ruud Vormer (born 1988), football player
 Maikel van der Werff (born 1989), football player
 Roland Alberg (born 1990), football player
 Nadine Broersen (born 1990), track and field athlete
 Marco Bizot (born 1991), football player
 Lorenzo Ebecilio (born 1991), football player
 Nicole Koolhaas (born 1991), volleyball player
 Brandley Kuwas (born 1992), football player
 Sonny Stevens (born 1992), football player
 Paul Kok (born 1994), football player
 Bas Schouten (born 1994), racing driver
 Nadine Visser (born 1995), track athlete
 Inessa Kaagman (born 1996), football player
 Maaike Boogaard (born 1998), racing cyclist
 Dani de Wit (born 1998), football player
 Dagmar Boom (born 2000), volleyball player
 Kenzo Goudmijn (born 2001), football player
 Sontje Hansen (born 2002), football player

Residing 
The following is a list of people who were born elsewhere, but are notable (former) residents of Hoorn:

 David Pietersz. de Vries (ca. 1593–1655), explorer
 Andreas Cellarius (1596–1665), cartographer
 Jan Albertsz Rotius (1624–1666), painter
 Miep Gies (1909–2010), helper of the Frank family
 Edgar Vos (1931–2010), fashion designer
 Milly Scott (born 1933), singer and actress
 Bonnie St. Claire (born 1949), singer
 Ernesto Hoost (born 1965), kickboxer
 Sylvana Simons (born 1971), presenter and politician
 Steven van Weyenberg (born 1973), politician
 Lobke Berkhout (born 1980), Olympic sailor
 Dean Saunders (born 1981), singer
 Ben Saunders (born 1983), singer

International relations

Partner cities 
Hoorn is twinned with the following cities and municipalities:
  Beersel, Belgium (since 1968)
  Příbram, Czech Republic (since 1992)

Friendships 
  Lewes, Delaware, United States
 Lewes was the site of the first European settlement in Delaware: a whaling and trading post that Dutch settlers led by David Pieterszoon de Vries established in 1631 and named Zwaanendael. Upon their arrival in the Delaware Bay, they entered a kill which De Vries named "Hoornkill" after his hometown Hoorn. Nowadays, the city's Zwaanendael Museum is located in a replica of the Statenlogement, the former city hall of Hoorn. Although Hoorn and Lewes have never officially been partner cities, there is close informal relationship between the two towns. Delegations from Hoorn and Lewes have visited each other's cities in light of Lewes's 375th and Hoorn's 650th anniversary in 2006 and 2007 respectively.

  Malacca City, Malaysia (since 1989)
 In 1641, the Dutch conquered the colony of Malacca from the Portuguese. During the Dutch rule, the iconic Stadthuys was built – a replica of the first city hall of Hoorn, which was demolished in 1797. Hoorn and Malacca became sister cities in 1989, but the partnership was officially ended in 2005. The cities still maintain an informal relationship as "friendship cities".

Notes

References

Literature

External links

Official website

Hoorn
Cities in the Netherlands
Municipalities of North Holland
Populated places in North Holland